The 1968–69 Philadelphia Flyers season was the Philadelphia Flyers' second season in the National Hockey League (NHL). The Flyers lost in the quarterfinals to the St. Louis Blues for the second consecutive season.

Off-season
The Flyers coaxed Dick Cherry, who they selected in the 1967 NHL Expansion Draft, out of retirement by agreeing to a three-year contract.

Lou Angotti, the Flyers first captain, was involved in a three-team trade. The Flyers traded Angotti to the St. Louis Blues for Darryl Edestrand and Gerry Melnyk and the Blues subsequently traded Angotti to the Pittsburgh Penguins. Melnyk suffered a heart attack in training camp and retired to become a scout for the team.

The Flyers claimed veteran defenseman Allan Stanley in the reverse draft from the Toronto Maple Leafs.

Regular season
Defenseman Ed Van Impe was named Angotti's replacement as captain in November.

Led by Van Impe and the team-leading 24 goals of Andre Lacroix, the Flyers struggled finishing 15 games under .500.

Season standings

Record vs. opponents

Playoffs
Despite the poor regular season showing, they made the playoffs; however, they were manhandled by St. Louis in a four-game sweep. Not wanting his team to be physically outmatched again, owner Ed Snider instructed general manager Bud Poile to acquire bigger, tougher players.

Schedule and results

Regular season

|- style="background:#fcf;"
| 1 || October 13 || Philadelphia || 2–3 || Boston || Parent || 14,011 || 0–1–0 || 0 || 
|- style="background:#fcf;"
| 2 || October 16 || Philadelphia || 1–3 || New York || Favell || 15,906 || 0–2–0 || 0 || 
|- style="background:#cfc;"
| 3 || October 17 || Pittsburgh || 0–3 || Philadelphia || Parent || 9,862 || 1–2–0 || 2 || 
|- style="background:#ffc;"
| 4 || October 24 || Minnesota || 3–3 || Philadelphia || Parent || 8,933 || 1–2–1 || 3 || 
|- style="background:#fcf;"
| 5 || October 26 || Philadelphia || 2–6 || Los Angeles || Favell || 6,597 || 1–3–1 || 3 || 
|- style="background:#ffc;"
| 6 || October 27 || Philadelphia || 2–2 || Oakland || Favell || 1,892 || 1–3–2 || 4 || 
|- style="background:#fcf;"
| 7 || October 30 || Philadelphia || 1–4 || St. Louis || Parent || 10,754 || 1–4–2 || 4 || 
|- style="background:#fcf;"
| 8 || October 31 || New York || 2–1 || Philadelphia || Parent || 9,429 || 1–5–2 || 4 || 
|-

|- style="background:#cfc;"
| 9 || November 2 || Philadelphia || 3–2 || Toronto || Parent || 16,470 || 2–5–2 || 6 || 
|- style="background:#cfc;"
| 10 || November 3 || Montreal || 2–3 || Philadelphia || Parent || 12,431 || 3–5–2 || 8 || 
|- style="background:#fcf;"
| 11 || November 6 || Philadelphia || 1–7 || Boston || Parent || 13,744 || 3–6–2 || 8 || 
|- style="background:#fcf;"
| 12 || November 7 || St. Louis || 8–0 || Philadelphia || Favell || 9,164 || 3–7–2 || 8 || 
|- style="background:#cfc;"
| 13 || November 9 || Philadelphia || 3–0 || Pittsburgh || Favell || 7,284 || 4–7–2 || 10 || 
|- style="background:#fcf;"
| 14 || November 13 || Philadelphia || 3–4 || Minnesota || Favell || 10,918 || 4–8–2 || 10 || 
|- style="background:#cfc;"
| 15 || November 14 || Boston || 2–4 || Philadelphia || Parent || 10,192 || 5–8–2 || 12 || 
|- style="background:#cfc;"
| 16 || November 17 || Los Angeles || 1–3 || Philadelphia || Parent || 9,125 || 6–8–2 || 14 || 
|- style="background:#fcf;"
| 17 || November 21 || Montreal || 3–0 || Philadelphia || Parent || 11,269 || 6–9–2 || 14 || 
|- style="background:#fcf;"
| 18 || November 23 || Oakland || 2–1 || Philadelphia || Favell || 11,932 || 6–10–2 || 14 || 
|- style="background:#fcf;"
| 19 || November 24 || Los Angeles || 3–1 || Philadelphia || Parent || 9,086 || 6–11–2 || 14 || 
|- style="background:#fcf;"
| 20 || November 27 || Detroit || 5–2 || Philadelphia || Favell || 11,380 || 6–12–2 || 14 || 
|- style="background:#fcf;"
| 21 || November 30 || Philadelphia || 0–1 || St. Louis || Parent || 15,314 || 6–13–2 || 14 || 
|-

|- style="background:#ffc;"
| 22 || December 1 || Philadelphia || 3–3 || Detroit || Parent || 13,039 || 6–13–3 || 15 || 
|- style="background:#fcf;"
| 23 || December 4 || Philadelphia || 1–3 || Los Angeles || Parent || 5,847 || 6–14–3 || 15 || 
|- style="background:#fcf;"
| 24 || December 6 || Philadelphia || 0–4 || Oakland || Favell || 3,166 || 6–15–3 || 15 || 
|- style="background:#ffc;"
| 25 || December 8 || St. Louis || 4–4 || Philadelphia || Parent || 10,329 || 6–15–4 || 16 || 
|- style="background:#fcf;"
| 26 || December 12 || Toronto || 1–0 || Philadelphia || Parent || 8,531 || 6–16–4 || 16 || 
|- style="background:#fcf;"
| 27 || December 14 || Philadelphia || 0–1 || Montreal || Parent || 16,584 || 6–17–4 || 16 || 
|- style="background:#cfc;"
| 28 || December 15 || Philadelphia || 3–1 || New York || Parent || 12,731 || 7–17–4 || 18 || 
|- style="background:#cfc;"
| 29 || December 17 || Pittsburgh || 2–8 || Philadelphia || Parent || 6,986 || 8–17–4 || 20 || 
|- style="background:#ffc;"
| 30 || December 19 || Minnesota || 5–5 || Philadelphia || Parent || 8,394 || 8–17–5 || 21 || 
|- style="background:#cfc;"
| 31 || December 21 || Philadelphia || 2–1 || Los Angeles || Favell || 7,108 || 9–17–5 || 23 || 
|- style="background:#fcf;"
| 32 || December 22 || Philadelphia || 1–2 || Oakland || Favell || 1,829 || 9–18–5 || 23 || 
|- style="background:#ffc;"
| 33 || December 25 || New York || 2–2 || Philadelphia || Favell || 9,545 || 9–18–6 || 24 || 
|- style="background:#ffc;"
| 34 || December 27 || Philadelphia || 3–3 || Detroit || Parent || 11,935 || 9–18–7 || 25 || 
|- style="background:#fcf;"
| 35 || December 29 || Oakland || 2–1 || Philadelphia || Parent || 12,767 || 9–19–7 || 25 || 
|-

|- style="background:#ffc;"
| 36 || January 2 || Chicago || 2–2 || Philadelphia || Favell || 13,290 || 9–19–8 || 26 || 
|- style="background:#ffc;"
| 37 || January 4 || Philadelphia || 1–1 || Pittsburgh || Favell || 6,329 || 9–19–9 || 27 || 
|- style="background:#ffc;"
| 38 || January 5 || Toronto || 2–2 || Philadelphia || Parent || 11,274 || 9–19–10 || 28 || 
|- style="background:#ffc;"
| 39 || January 8 || Philadelphia || 4–4 || Toronto || Favell || 16,331 || 9–19–11 || 29 || 
|- style="background:#fcf;"
| 40 || January 9 || New York || 3–1 || Philadelphia || Parent || 10,147 || 9–20–11 || 29 || 
|- style="background:#cfc;"
| 41 || January 11 || Philadelphia || 4–2 || Minnesota || Parent || 12,462 || 10–20–11 || 31 || 
|- style="background:#fcf;"
| 42 || January 15 || Philadelphia || 3–4 || St. Louis || Favell || 13,184 || 10–21–11 || 31 || 
|- style="background:#fcf;"
| 43 || January 16 || Montreal || 4–0 || Philadelphia || Parent || 12,728 || 10–22–11 || 31 || 
|- style="background:#fcf;"
| 44 || January 18 || Boston || 5–3 || Philadelphia || Favell || 14,558 || 10–23–11 || 31 || 
|- style="background:#cfc;"
| 45 || January 19 || Detroit || 1–3 || Philadelphia || Parent || 13,949 || 11–23–11 || 33 || 
|- style="background:#ffc;"
| 46 || January 23 || Philadelphia || 2–2 || Chicago || Parent || 18,500 || 11–23–12 || 34 || 
|- style="background:#fcf;"
| 47 || January 25 || Philadelphia || 3–6 || Montreal || Parent || 16,884 || 11–24–12 || 34 || 
|- style="background:#cfc;"
| 48 || January 26 || Pittsburgh || 3–5 || Philadelphia || Favell || 10,987 || 12–24–12 || 36 || 
|- style="background:#fcf;"
| 49 || January 30 || Chicago || 12–0 || Philadelphia || Favell || 13,005 || 12–25–12 || 36 || 
|-

|- style="background:#ffc;"
| 50 || February 1 || Philadelphia || 2–2 || Pittsburgh || Parent || 5,866 || 12–25–13 || 37 || 
|- style="background:#fcf;"
| 51 || February 2 || Minnesota || 3–2 || Philadelphia || Parent || 13,294 || 12–26–13 || 37 || 
|- style="background:#fcf;"
| 52 || February 4 || Detroit || 2–0 || Philadelphia || Parent || 8,375 || 12–27–13 || 37 || 
|- style="background:#fcf;"
| 53 || February 8 || Philadelphia || 5–6 || Boston || Parent || 14,659 || 12–28–13 || 37 || 
|- style="background:#ffc;"
| 54 || February 9 || Philadelphia || 3–3 || New York || Parent || 5,723 || 12–28–14 || 38 || 
|- style="background:#ffc;"
| 55 || February 12 || Philadelphia || 3–3 || Chicago || Parent || 17,800 || 12–28–15 || 39 || 
|- style="background:#fcf;"
| 56 || February 13 || St. Louis || 2–1 || Philadelphia || Parent || 9,362 || 12–29–15 || 39 || 
|- style="background:#fcf;"
| 57 || February 15 || Chicago || 3–0 || Philadelphia || Parent || 14,558 || 12–30–15 || 39 || 
|- style="background:#cfc;"
| 58 || February 16 || Oakland || 2–3 || Philadelphia || Parent || 11,104 || 13–30–15 || 41 || 
|- style="background:#fcf;"
| 59 || February 19 || Philadelphia || 1–3 || St. Louis || Parent || 15,072 || 13–31–15 || 41 || 
|- style="background:#fcf;"
| 60 || February 22 || Philadelphia || 1–4 || Montreal || Parent || 17,304 || 13–32–15 || 41 || 
|- style="background:#fcf;"
| 61 || February 23 || Philadelphia || 1–9 || Detroit || Parent || 14,361 || 13–33–15 || 41 || 
|- style="background:#ffc;"
| 62 || February 27 || Toronto || 1–1 || Philadelphia || Parent || 11,935 || 13–33–16 || 42 || 
|-

|- style="background:#ffc;"
| 63 || March 1 || Philadelphia || 2–2 || Los Angeles || Parent || 9,534 || 13–33–17 || 43 || 
|- style="background:#ffc;"
| 64 || March 2 || Philadelphia || 4–4 || Oakland || Parent || 4,484 || 13–33–18 || 44 || 
|- style="background:#cfc;"
| 65 || March 6 || Los Angeles || 1–5 || Philadelphia || Parent || 9,428 || 14–33–18 || 46 || 
|- style="background:#ffc;"
| 66 || March 8 || Philadelphia || 2–2 || Toronto || Parent || 16,485 || 14–33–19 || 47 || 
|- style="background:#cfc;"
| 67 || March 9 || Oakland || 3–5 || Philadelphia || Parent || 13,885 || 15–33–19 || 49 || 
|- style="background:#cfc;"
| 68 || March 13 || Boston || 1–2 || Philadelphia || Parent || 14,558 || 16–33–19 || 51 || 
|- style="background:#ffc;"
| 69 || March 15 || Philadelphia || 2–2 || Minnesota || Parent || 14,662 || 16–33–20 || 52 || 
|- style="background:#fcf;"
| 70 || March 16 || Philadelphia || 2–6 || Chicago || Parent || 17,000 || 16–34–20 || 52 || 
|- style="background:#cfc;"
| 71 || March 20 || Minnesota || 2–5 || Philadelphia || Parent || 12,582 || 17–34–20 || 54 || 
|- style="background:#cfc;"
| 72 || March 22 || Philadelphia || 5–1 || Minnesota || Parent || 14,664 || 18–34–20 || 56 || 
|- style="background:#cfc;"
| 73 || March 23 || St. Louis || 3–4 || Philadelphia || Parent || 14,558 || 19–34–20 || 58 || 
|- style="background:#cfc;"
| 74 || March 27 || Los Angeles || 2–4 || Philadelphia || Parent || 11,669 || 20–34–20 || 60 || 
|- style="background:#ffc;"
| 75 || March 29 || Pittsburgh || 3–3 || Philadelphia || Parent || 11,039 || 20–34–21 || 61 || 
|- style="background:#fcf;"
| 76 || March 30 || Philadelphia || 1–2 || Pittsburgh || Favell || 5,738 || 20–35–21 || 61 || 
|-

|-
| Legend:

Playoffs

|- style="background:#fcf;"
| 1 || April 2 || Philadelphia || 2–5 || St. Louis ||  || Parent || 15,156 || Blues lead 1–0 || 
|- style="background:#fcf;"
| 2 || April 3 || Philadelphia || 0–5 || St. Louis ||  || Favell || 15,261  || Blues lead 2–0 || 
|- style="background:#fcf;"
| 3 || April 5 || St. Louis || 3–0 || Philadelphia ||  || Parent || 14,558 || Blues lead 3–0 || 
|- style="background:#fcf;"
| 4 || April 6 || St. Louis || 4–1 || Philadelphia ||  || Parent || 10,995 || Blues win 4–0 || 
|-

|-
| Legend:

Player statistics

Scoring
 Position abbreviations: C = Center; D = Defense; G = Goaltender; LW = Left Wing; RW = Right Wing
  = Joined team via a transaction (e.g., trade, waivers, signing) during the season. Stats reflect time with the Flyers only.
  = Left team via a transaction (e.g., trade, waivers, release) during the season. Stats reflect time with the Flyers only.

Goaltending

Awards and records

Awards

Records

Among the franchise records set during the 1968–69 season, the Flyers had two tie-related streaks. They tied four games in a row from January 2 to January 8, which was matched during the 1991–92 season, and they tied four road games in a row from March 1 to March 15. On January 30, they allowed 12 goals against to the Chicago Black Hawks, a single game franchise high. Their six road wins on the season is tied for the fewest in franchise history with the 1969–70 team.

Transactions
The Flyers were involved in the following transactions from May 12, 1968, the day after the deciding game of the 1968 Stanley Cup Finals, through May 4, 1969, the day of the deciding game of the 1969 Stanley Cup Finals.

Trades

Players acquired

Players lost

Signings

Draft picks

NHL Amateur Draft
Philadelphia's picks at the 1968 NHL Amateur Draft, which was held at the Queen Elizabeth Hotel in Montreal, Quebec, on June 13, 1968.

NHL Special Internal Amateur Draft
Philadelphia's picks at the 1968 NHL Special Internal Amateur Draft, which was held at the Queen Elizabeth Hotel in Montreal, Quebec, on June 13, 1968. Sponsored players aged 20 before May 31, 1968, who played as amateurs during the 1967–68 season were eligible for selection.

Farm teams
The Flyers were affiliated with the Quebec Aces of the AHL, the Seattle Totems of the WHL, and the Jersey Devils of the EHL.

Notes

References
General
 
 
 
Specific

Philadelphia
Philadelphia
Philadelphia Flyers seasons
Philad
Philad